Winfred O. "Fred" Jacobs (December 2, 1922 – October 19, 2008) was an American professional basketball player. He played in 16 games for the Basketball Association of America's St. Louis Bombers during the first half of the 1946–47 season. Jacobs played college basketball at the University of Denver.

BAA career statistics

Regular season

References

External links

1922 births
2008 deaths
Denver Pioneers men's basketball players
Forwards (basketball)
St. Louis Bombers (NBA) players
Undrafted National Basketball Association players
American men's basketball players